York Landing Airport  is located adjacent to York Landing, Manitoba, Canada.

Airlines and destinations

References

External links

Certified airports in Manitoba